Brandon Quinn (born Brandon Quinn Swierenga, October 7, 1977) is an American television and film actor. He started his career in 1998 as Charles Murphy in the film Express: Aisle to Glory.

He has acted in other TV series and films such as Chicken Soup for the Soul, The Nightmare Room, Big Wolf on Campus, What I Like About You, CSI: Crime Scene Investigation, Malachance, Charmed, and Sweet Magnolias.

Personal life
Quinn is of British, Irish and Dutch descent. After Quinn got the part to play Tommy Dawkins on Big Wolf on Campus, he has admitted that he initially didn't know where Montreal was, the city's filming location.

Selected filmography

Motion pictures
 Fast Glass aka Kill Speed
 The Morgue
 Thirst
 Silent Night (short film)
 Express: Aisle to Glory (1998)
 2023; Die Hart Film

Television
 2022: Cloudy With a Chance of Christmas - Drake (Hallmark)
 2022: A Country Christmas Harmony - Luke Covington
 2022: Creepshow - Wade Cruise (in "The Last Tsuburaya")
 2020: A Welcome Home Christmas (Lifetime TV Film)  - Michael Fischer
 2020-2022: Sweet Magnolias - Ronnie Sullivan (Season 1 Episode 10, series regular since Season 2)
 2019: Grand Hotel (TV series) - Victor Calloway (Season 1 Episode 4)
 2019: Sins and Seduction
 2017: Kevin (probably) Saves the World - Ignacio 'Iggy' DePerro (Season 1 Episode 7)
 2017: Grey's Anatomy - Leo (Season 13 Episode 19)
 2017: Rebel - Thompson "Mack" McIntyre (Season 1 episodes 1-9)
 2016: NCIS - Greg Abell (Season 14 Episode 3 "Privileged Information")
 2016: The Fosters - Gabe Duncroft (Season 3 Episode 13 - Season 5 Episode 19)
 2015: Grimm - Charlie Riken (Season 4 Episodes 9 and 10)
 2014: Looking for Mr. Right - Henry (Hallmark Channel Original Movie)
 2013: Bones - Peter Kidman (Season 9, Episode 9 - "The Fury in the Jury")
 2013: Melissa & Joey - Eric (Season 3 Episode 2 - "Toxic Parents")
 2011: Against the Wall – Richie Kowalski
 2010: The Vampire Diaries – Episode: "Bloodlines" (Lee)
 2008: Knight Rider (2008 TV series) - Max Hunter (Season 1 Episode 7 - "I Wanna Rock 'N Roll All Knight")
 2007: Entourage – Tom
 2006: The O.C. – Spencer Bullit
 2006: Vanished – Mark Valera
 2006: Without a Trace "The Stranger" – Bartender
 2005: Twins "Musical Chairs" – Keith
 2005: Charmed – Agent Murphy 
 2005: Reba "Flowers for Van" – Delivery Guy 
 2004: CSI: Crime Scene Investigation "No More Bets" – Dead guy
 2004: Drake & Josh "Football" – Mark 
 2003: What I Like About You "Partially Obstructed View" – Glenn
 2002: The Nightmare Room "Camp Nowhere: Part 1" – Ramos
 1999–2002: Big Wolf on Campus'' – Tommy Dawkins

References

External links

1977 births
Living people
Male actors from Colorado
American male television actors
People from Aurora, Colorado